The Doomed is a 1924 German silent drama film directed by Eugen Illés and starring Bernd Aldor, Sascha Gura and Erich Kaiser-Titz.

The film's sets were designed by Illés and the art director Artur Günther

Cast
 Bernd Aldor as Artur Rys, Großindustrieller
 Sascha Gura as Gladys, seine Schwester
 Erich Kaiser-Titz as Ingenieur Ohlsen
 Arthur Kraußneck as Mathimatiker Robin
 Maria Zelenka as Renate, seine Tochter
 Eugen Rex as Prinz d'Orlando
 Jaro Fürth as der Abgeordneter Korell
 Franz Schönfeld as Kriegsminsiter

References

Bibliography
 Alfred Krautz. International directory of cinematographers, set- and costume designers in film, Volume 4. Saur, 1984.

External links

1924 films
Films of the Weimar Republic
German silent feature films
Films directed by Eugen Illés
German black-and-white films
National Film films
1920s German films